The 2014 Autobacs Super GT Series was the twenty-second season of the Japan Automobile Federation Super GT Championship including the All Japan Grand Touring Car Championship (JGTC) era, and the tenth season under the name Super GT. It marked the thirty-second season overall of a Japanese professional sportscar championship dating back to the All Japan Sports Prototype Championship. It was the first year of new GT500 regulations as the 2014 season saw unified technical regulations with the Deutsche Tourenwagen Masters. The season began on April 6 and ended on November 16, after 8 races.

Schedule
A provisional calendar was released on August 12, 2013.

Calendar changes
The Autopolis race was moved from its October date to the June date previously held by the Super Formula championship.
After being on the calendar since 2000, the race at the Sepang International Circuit will not be held in 2014.
After being on the provisional calendar as a non-championship round for 2013, the championship was scheduled to race in South Korea for the first time, at a yet to be determined venue. However, on December 16, 2013, the race was again cancelled.
The championship will also host its first race in Thailand, at the newly built Buriram United International Circuit.
The non-championship races at the JAF Grand Prix, was dropped for the 2014 season, the JAF Grand Prix later becoming the final round of the 2014 Super Formula season instead.

Drivers and teams

GT500

GT300

Rule changes

GT500

It was announced on October 16, 2012 that the Super GT championship and the Deutsche Tourenwagen Masters will unify technical regulations for the 2014 season. The previous GT500 engines of 3.4L V8 in capacity were replaced with 2.0L Turbocharged Inline-four engines. With the new rule changes, all 3 manufacturers ran the 2014 season with new cars, the Honda HSV-010 GT and the Lexus SC430 being replaced by the new mid-engined Honda NSX-GT and the Lexus RC F respectively while Nissan continued to use the GT-R for 2014, but with a new car built for the new regulations. All 3 cars were unveiled at the 2013 42nd International Pokka Sapporo 1000km.

Calendar

Standings

GT500 Drivers
Scoring system

GT300 Drivers

References

External links
  

2014
 
Super GT